Henry John Sauer (March 17, 1917 – August 24, 2001) was an American professional baseball player, coach and scout. He appeared in 1,399 games, primarily as a left fielder, in Major League Baseball (MLB) for the Cincinnati Reds (1941–1942, 1945, 1948–1949), Chicago Cubs (1949–1955), St. Louis Cardinals (1956), and New York / San Francisco Giants (1957–1959).

A two-time All-Star, Sauer hit more than 30 home runs six times in the seven seasons of 1948 through 1954. Sauer and Johnny Bench are the only players in major league history ever to have hit three homers in a single game twice against the same pitcher. He did it  and 1952 while with the Cubs, victimizing Curt Simmons of the Philadelphia Phillies. A younger brother, Ed, also an outfielder, played in 189 games in the majors for three National League teams during the 1940s.

Career

He threw and batted right-handed. He started his professional career in the New York Yankees' organization, and was acquired by Cincinnati in October 1939 after three minor league seasons. After two short stints totaling 16 games with the – Reds, World War II service in the United States Coast Guard, then another audition, this time 31 games, for the  Reds, Sauer spent the full seasons of 1946 and 1947 with the Triple-A Syracuse Chiefs. In the latter year, Sauer led the 1947 International League in runs scored (130), hits (182) and runs batted in (141); he slugged 50 homers, three fewer than league leader Howie Moss, and hit .336, one percentage point behind batting champion Nippy Jones. He was named the circuit's MVP.

His breakout season in Syracuse earned him a permanent major league spot, at age 31, with the  Reds, and Sauer would play in over one hundred games in every season through 1954. As Cincinnati's regular left fielder in 1948, Sauer slugged 35 home runs, fourth in the National League.

Popular Cub of early 1950s
During a time when the Cubs were especially moribund, Sauer provided some joy for the team's fans with his power hitting, earning him the nickname "The Mayor of Wrigley Field". In addition to his 37 blasts in 1952 and 41 in 1954, Sauer also put up seasons of 27, 32 and 30 home runs as a Cub. He was well known for using smokeless tobacco, and it has often been reported that after he hit a home run, when he returned to his left field position, bleacher fans might shower him with packets of his favorite chew, Beech Nut tobacco.

Sauer was not especially fleet afoot. In contrast to radio's Quiz Kids or the 1950 Phillies "Whiz Kids", according to Chicago columnist Mike Royko the 1950s Cubs had an outfield "that was so slow they were known as the Quicksand Kids." Sauer, Baumholtz and Kiner played left, center and right fields, respectively.

One of the highlights of Sauer's tenure in Chicago occurred during the 1952 Major League Baseball All-Star Game, played July 8 at Shibe Park, Philadelphia. Starting in left field for the National League, Sauer came to bat in the fourth inning with the NL trailing 2–1 and Stan Musial on first base. Facing eventual Hall of Famer Bob Lemon, Sauer belted a two-run homer to give his team the lead. When the game was called due to rain after it had completed the mandatory five innings, the NL was awarded the 3–2 victory and Sauer's homer stood as the winning blow.

In , Sauer recorded career highs of 41 home runs, 98 runs scored, and a .938 OPS. He appeared in 75 games for the Redbirds that season and batted .298 in part-time duty, but—nearing his 40th birthday—he was handed his unconditional release October 16.

In his 15-season MLB career, Sauer was a .266 hitter with 288 home runs and 876 runs batted in. His 1,278 hits also included 200 doubles and 19 triples. He died of a heart attack while playing golf in Burlingame, California, on August 24, 2001, at the age of 84.

See also
 List of Major League Baseball career home run leaders
 List of Major League Baseball annual runs batted in leaders

References

External links

1917 births
2001 deaths
Akron Yankees players
American Roman Catholics
Baseball players from Pittsburgh
Birmingham Barons players
Burials at Holy Cross Cemetery (Colma, California)
Butler Yankees players
Chicago Cubs players
Cincinnati Reds players
International League MVP award winners
Major League Baseball hitting coaches
Major League Baseball left fielders
Minor league baseball managers
National League All-Stars
National League home run champions
National League Most Valuable Player Award winners
National League RBI champions
New York Giants (NL) players
St. Louis Cardinals players
San Francisco Giants coaches
San Francisco Giants players
San Francisco Giants scouts
Sportspeople from Pittsburgh
Syracuse Chiefs players
United States Coast Guard personnel of World War II